The 1981–82 Segunda Divisão season was the 43rd season of recognised second-tier football in Portugal.

Overview
The league was contested by 48 teams in 3 divisions with C.S. Marítimo, Varzim S.C. and G.C. Alcobaça winning the respective divisional competitions and gaining promotion to the Primeira Liga.  The overall championship was won by C.S. Marítimo.

League standings

Segunda Divisão - Zona Norte

Segunda Divisão - Zona Centro

Segunda Divisão - Zona Sul

Play-offs

Championship play-off

Promotion play-off

Footnotes

External links
 - footballzz.co.uk

Portuguese Second Division seasons
Port
2